Geoffrey Ingham is a British sociologist, political economist, and author of books on capitalism and money.

Career 

Ingham was born in 1942, and read sociology at the University of Leicester, graduating in 1964.  He attended Cambridge University as a postgraduate student, where he was awarded a Ph.D degree in 1968.  After teaching at Sussex and Leicester Universities, he became a Fellow of Christ's College, Cambridge in 1972.  He was Reader in Sociology and Political Economy at Cambridge, and remains Emeritus Reader and a Fellow of Christ's.

Works 

 Money. What is Political Economy (2020)
 Capitalism (2008)
 Money: Interdisciplinary Perspectives from Economics, Sociology and Political Science (2005)
 The Nature of Money (2004)
 Capitalism Divided? The City and Industry in British Social Development (1984)

References

External links 

 

Living people
British sociologists
1942 births
Alumni of the University of Cambridge
Alumni of the University of Leicester
Academics of the University of Sussex
Academics of the University of Leicester
Fellows of Christ's College, Cambridge
Political economists